The men's 100 metre backstroke at the 2009 World Championships took place Monday 27 July (prelims and semifinals) and on the evening of Tuesday 28 July (final) at the Foro Italico in Rome, Italy.

Records
Prior to this competition, the existing world and competition records were as follows:

The following records were established during the competition:

Results

Heats

Semifinals

Final

See also
Swimming at the 2007 World Aquatics Championships – Men's 100 metre backstroke
Swimming at the 2008 Summer Olympics – Men's 100 metre backstroke

References
Worlds 2009 results: Men's 100m Back Heats; published by OmegaTiming.com (official timer of the '09 Worlds); retrieved 2009-07-28.
Worlds 2009 results: Men's 100m Back Semifinals; published by OmegaTiming.com (official timer of the '09 Worlds); retrieved 2009-07-28.
Worlds 2009 results: Men's 100m Back Final; published by OmegaTiming.com (official timer of the '09 Worlds); retrieved 2009-07-28.

Backstroke Men 100